Joy Gorman Wettels (born October 26, 1973) is an American television producer and founder of JOY COALITION. She is executive producer of Unprisoned, 13 Reasons Why  and Home Before Dark.Early life
Gorman Wettels grew up in Yonkers, New York. She enrolled at Barnard College at Columbia University and joined the college's revue The Varsity Show. After spending her post-college years working in casting and development, Gorman became a manager in 2002, with two young clients, Dana Fox, and Brian Yorkey whom she had met through The Varsity Show: Subsequently, she helped shepherd their Pulitzer & Tony winning musical NEXT TO NORMAL to Broadway for over a decade.  

Career
Joy Gorman Wettels is the founder of JOY COALITION, an impact producing venture with a focus on premium, purpose-driven content for a global audience.  

Gorman Wettels was previously a partner at Anonymous Content, where she worked closely with legendary producer Steve Golin for 14 years and was integral in the transition of his award-winning management and production entity to a prolific TV studio.

Gorman Wettels executive produced UNPRISONED, Tracy McMillan’s semi-autobiographical exploration of the effects of incarceration on a family starring Kerry Washington for Onyx Collective/ABC Signature, which debuted on Hulu March 10th.  

She is also producing a multi-part storytelling ecosystem for Warner Media inspired by Landmark Civil Rights docu-series EYES ON THE PRIZE in partnership with Dawn Porter, Melina Matsoukas, Patrisse Cullors, and original producers BLACKSIDE. The first installment, EYES ON THE PRIZE: HALLOWED GROUND is now streaming on HBO Max.  

Joy previously produced the groundbreaking Netflix/Paramount hit series 13 REASONS WHY, created by Pulitzer and Tony Award-winning playwright Brian Yorkey and directed by Oscar-winner Tom McCarthy (SPOTLIGHT). The series started a global conversation around teen suicide, mental health, and sexual violence and remains one of Netflix’s most viewed series of all time. She also produced Apple TV’s critically acclaimed series HOME BEFORE DARK, inspired by the true story of nine year old journalist Hilde Lysiak and directed by Jon M. Chu. Joy’s producing career began with acclaimed filmmaker Lorene Scafaria’s directorial debut SEEKING A FRIEND FOR THE END OF THE WORLD for Focus Features and follow-up THE MEDDLER for Sony Pictures Classics, named Vanity Fair's #1 film of 2016. Her upcoming development slate also includes a new adaptation of LITTLE HOUSE ON THE PRAIRIE for Paramount TV Studios/Anonymous Content Studio. 

Gorman Wettels serves on the Advisory Council for UCLA’s Center for Scholars and Storytellers and the Advisory Board for Hollywood, Health & Society at USC Annenberg’s Norman Lear Center. In support of Joy Coalition’s commitment to social change, they are currently collaborating with the office of the U.S. Surgeon General, Dr. Vivek Murthy, in response to the urgent youth mental health crisis, as well as establishing a coalition of young people across cultural and socioeconomic backgrounds to consult on programming to ensure truthful representation. Previous impact partners include Think of Us, Reform Alliance, SafeBae, American Foundation for Suicide Prevention.  Joy has spoken at several events including the United State of Women Summit at DC Women’s March, Sundance, Teen Vogue Summit, the Society for Research in Child Development Global Conference, and an It’s On Us call to action against sexual violence with President Joe Biden.  On behalf of 13 Reasons Why, she’s accepted a Sentinel Award, Television Academy Honors for advancing social change, and the 2018 Mental Health America Media Award.

Joy is a member of the Producers Guild of America and the Television Academy.

Awards13 Reasons Why received 2018 Television Academy Honors for advancing social change. On behalf of the 13 Reasons Why team, she's accepted a Sentinel Award, Television Academy Honors and the 2018 Mental Health America Media Award. Joy has been awarded The American Legion Hollywood Post 43 Patriot Award, for service to veterans and Hollywood.

Filmography

{| class="wikitable"
|-
! Title !! Year !! Role
|-
| Seeking a Friend for the End of the World || 2012 || Producer
|-
| Adult World || 2013 || Producer
|-
| The Meddler || 2015 || Producer
|-
| 13 Reasons Why || 2017–2020 || Executive Producer
|-
| This is Personal|| 2019 || Producer
|-
| Home Before Dark|| 2020–present || Executive Producer
|-
| Eyes on the Prize: Hallowed Ground|| 2021 || Executive Producer ||
|-
| Unprisoned''

References

People from Yonkers, New York
American women film producers
Barnard College alumni
Living people
American women television producers
1973 births
21st-century American women